When It Rains, It Pours may refer to:

"When It Rains, It Pours" (30 Rock), a television episode
"When It Rains It Pours" (song), by Luke Combs
"When It Rains It Pours" (Tokio Hotel song), by Tokio Hotel
"When it rains, it pours", a slogan used by the American company Morton Salt

See also
"When It Rains, It Really Pours", a song by Billy "The Kid" Emerson, covered by Elvis Presley
When It Rains (disambiguation)